This is a list of events held and scheduled by the Aggression Fighting Championship (AFC), a mixed martial arts organization based in Canada.

Events

Aggression MMA

AMMA 1

AMMA 1: First Blood was held on October 24, 2009, at the Edmonton Expo Centre in Edmonton, Alberta.

Results

AMMA 2

AMMA 2: Vengeance was held on February 5, 2010, at the Edmonton Expo Centre in Edmonton, Alberta.

Results

AMMA 3

AMMA 3: Trilogy was held on May 21, 2010, at the Wesbild Centre in Vernon, British Columbia.

Results

AMMA 4

AMMA 4: Victory was held on July 9, 2010, at the Edmonton Expo Centre in Edmonton, Alberta.

Results

AMMA 5

AMMA 5: Uprising was held on October 1, 2010, at the Edmonton Expo Centre in Edmonton, Alberta.

Results

AMMA 6

AMMA 6: Edmonton was held on March 11, 2011, at the Shaw Conference Centre in Edmonton, Alberta.

Results

AMMA 7

AMMA 7: Confrontation was held on June 10, 2011, at the Shaw Conference Centre in Edmonton, Alberta.

Results

AMMA 8

AMMA 8: Unfinished Business was held on September 16, 2011, at the Shaw Conference Centre in Edmonton, Alberta.

Results

AMMA 9

AMMA 9: Aggression MMA 9 was held on February 11, 2012, at the Shaw Conference Centre in Edmonton, Alberta.

Results

Aggression / Armageddon Fighting Championship

AFC 1

AFC 1: Big Bang was held on August 22, 2009, at the Bear Mountain Arena in Victoria, British Columbia.

Results

AFC 2

AFC 2: Aftershock was held on March 6, 2010, at the Bear Mountain Arena in Victoria, British Columbia.

Results

AFC 3

AFC 3: Evolution was held on July 17, 2010, at the Bear Mountain Arena in Victoria, British Columbia.

Results

AFC 4

AFC 4: Revelation was held on November 6, 2010, at the Bear Mountain Arena in Victoria, British Columbia.

Results

AFC 5

AFC 5: Judgment Day was held on April 2, 2011, at the Bear Mountain Arena in Victoria, British Columbia.

Results

AFC 6

AFC 6: Conviction was held on June 18, 2011, at the Bear Mountain Arena in Victoria, British Columbia.

Results

AFC 7

AFC 7: Break Out was held on November 5, 2011, at the Bear Mountain Arena in Victoria, British Columbia.

Results

AFC 8

AFC 8: Vengeance was held on April 14, 2012, at the Bear Mountain Arena in Victoria, British Columbia.

Results

AFC 9

AFC 9: Inception was held on June 8, 2012, at the Shaw Conference Centre in Edmonton, Alberta.

Results

AFC 10

AFC 10: Rise was held on June 15, 2012, at the Telus Convention Centre in Calgary, Alberta.

Results

AFC 11

AFC 11: Takeover was held on September 15, 2012, at the Winnipeg Convention Centre in Winnipeg, Manitoba.

Results

AFC 12

AFC 12: Domination was held on November 2, 2012, at the Telus Convention Centre in Calgary, Alberta.

Results

AFC 13

AFC 13: Natural Selection was held on November 3, 2012, at the Bear Mountain Arena in Victoria, British Columbia.

Results

AFC 14

AFC 14: Invasion was held on November 23, 2012, at the Shaw Conference Centre in Edmonton, Alberta.

Results

AFC 15

AFC 15: The Ides was held on March 15, 2013, at the Telus Convention Centre in Calgary, Alberta.

Results

AFC 16

AFC 16: Uprising was held on March 23, 2013, at the Winnipeg Convention Centre in Winnipeg, Manitoba.

Results

AFC 17

AFC 17: Anarchy was held on March 23, 2013, at the Shaw Conference Centre in Edmonton, Alberta.

Results

AFC 18

AFC 18: Mayhem was held on May 19, 2013, at the Bear Mountain Arena in Victoria, British Columbia.

Results

AFC 19

AFC 19: Undisputed was held on July 5, 2013, at the Shaw Conference Centre in Edmonton, Alberta.

Results

AFC 20

AFC 20: Stampede Fight Night was held on July 12, 2013, at the Telus Convention Centre in Calgary, Alberta.

Results

Event locations 

These cities have hosted the following numbers of AFC and Aggression MMA  events as of AFC 20

  Canada (29)
 Edmonton, Alberta – 12
 Calgary, Alberta - 4
 Winnipeg, Manitoba - 2
 Vernon, British Columbia - 1
 Victoria, British Columbia - 10

References

External links 

AFC